Alkindi (born 6 April 1962) is an Indonesian fencer. He competed in the individual foil event at the 1988 Summer Olympics.

References

External links
 

1962 births
Living people
Indonesian male foil fencers
Olympic fencers of Indonesia
Fencers at the 1988 Summer Olympics